Community College Review is a quarterly peer-reviewed academic journal covering research and commentary on community colleges. The editor-in-chief is Jaime Lester (George Mason University). It was established in 1973 and is published by SAGE Publishing in association with North Carolina State University.

Abstracting and indexing
The journal is abstracted and indexed in:

References

External links

SAGE Publishing academic journals
English-language journals
Education journals
Quarterly journals
Publications established in 1973